Sde Tzvi (lit. Zvi Field) is a moshav in southern Israel. Located in the north-western Negev near Rahat, it falls under the jurisdiction of Merhavim Regional Council.

History
The village was established in 1953 by Jewish immigrants and refugees from North Africa. It was named after Zvi Hirshfeld, a founder of Ruhama who also helped found the new moshav.

References

External links
Sde Tzvi Negev Information Centre

Moshavim
Agricultural Union
Populated places established in 1953
Populated places in Southern District (Israel)
1953 establishments in Israel
North African-Jewish culture in Israel